Resting the starters is the substitution of regular players on a sports team with backup players, and it occurs when a team has clinched at least a playoff berth, often its division, and in many cases, home advantage, and no further regular season losses would hurt the team in the standings (or, inversely, if the team has been eliminated from playoff contention and has nothing further to gain by playing). This enables the team to avoid risking injury to the starters, and to give real life playing practice to backup players.

Veteran starters are also frequently rested in the final preseason games (or in some cases, the entire preseason schedule) in order to get them ready for the early part of the season and protect them from injury in non-competitive games.

Also, starters are sometimes rested during a game during garbage time when the outcome is mostly certain. While usually garbage time takes place toward the end of the fourth quarter of a game, in games where there is such a vast difference in talent and the winning team very quickly gains a large lead, the starters will be removed from the game early—sometimes well before the end of the first half—and the second- and lower-string players will play the remainder of the contest. As such, the starters play long enough only to gain a significant lead, and giving the reserves extended playing time.

Effects on players, team and league
The debate on whether or not it is a good idea to rest starters has not been resolved. Some analysts argue that it is good for the team by enabling the bodies of the players to be fresh, while others state it could make them more rusty.

While resting starters may have the advantage of preventing injuries, it may deprive them of various statistics they are trying to accomplish, particularly individual season records. A number of "iron man" players also strive to start each game and will outright refuse to rest unless catastrophically injured and under medical orders not to play, in order to maintain their starting streak.

In sports with a small number of games per season, such as gridiron football, there is also the argument over whether it is better for a team with a perfect record up to that point to rest players or to try for the perfect season. For example, the 2007 New England Patriots did not rest their starters and accomplished a perfect 16–0 regular season in a victory against the New York Giants (who also played their starters), but ultimately lost Super Bowl XLII to the same Giants team. The 2009 Indianapolis Colts, after starting 14–0 and clinching home field advantage throughout the playoffs, rested their starters and lost the final two games. They made it to Super Bowl XLIV, which they also lost.

The 2011 Green Bay Packers rested their starting quarterback Aaron Rodgers on the final game of the regular season, as the Packers had already secured the #1 seed in the NFC playoffs. Combined with the bye week earned with that seed, it would be a total of 3 weeks before Rodgers would play in a game again. The Packers lost their subsequent Divisional game vs. the New York Giants, leading commentators to wonder if the extra time off had been a detriment to Rodgers, as several crucial passes were dropped by the Packers in the game.

Resting the starters can be controversial if the game has playoff implications for the opponents. In such a scenario, the opposition could secure a playoff berth at the expense of another team. In extreme cases, teams have been accused of deliberately giving their opponents a better chance of winning where that week's opposition's presence in the playoffs is preferred to another team's, which could be considered "tanking" (a form of match fixing). A notable example of this was when the San Francisco 49ers, who had clinched a playoff berth, rested several starters and lost their regular-season finale in 1988 to the Los Angeles Rams, thereby knocking the New York Giants out of the postseason on tiebreakers (obstinately as the Giants had defeated the 49ers in the playoffs in both 1985 and 1986, also injuring 49er quarterback Joe Montana in the latter year's game); after the 49ers-Rams game, Giants quarterback Phil Simms angrily accused the 49ers of "laying down like dogs."

In 1993, the National Football League experimented with a two-bye week format. After the success of expanding the regular season to a period of 17 weeks in the 1990 NFL season, the league hoped this new schedule would generate even more revenue. However, teams felt that having two weeks off during the regular season was too disruptive for their weekly routines, and thus it reverted to 17 weeks immediately after the season ended. The negative effects of having two bye weeks can be similar to the negative effects of resting starters, as having several weeks off (in the case of a division winner, several consecutive weeks off), a player's routine can be hurt. Another proposal for a two-bye-week season, part of a proposal to extend the season to 17 games over 19 weeks, was discussed in collective bargaining agreement negotiations prior to the 2021 season but was ultimately not implemented. 

The NBA has also taken action in order to make sure teams aren't resting their starters at the cost of their fans losing interest as the regular season goes on, especially for high-profile nationally televised games where the league is counting on the starters to drive viewership. Teams can be fined for resting players en masse, which is known euphemistically in basketball as "load management".

See also
Squad rotation system
 DNP-CD, Did not play - Coach's decision, a designation used in basketball

References

Terminology used in multiple sports